Stockholm Convention on Persistent Organic Pollutants is an international environmental treaty, signed on 22 May 2001 in Stockholm and effective from 17 May 2004, that aims to eliminate or restrict the production and use of persistent organic pollutants (POPs).

History 
In 1995, the Governing Council of the United Nations Environment Programme (UNEP) called for global action to be taken on POPs, which it defined as "chemical substances that persist in the environment, bio-accumulate through the food web, and pose a risk of causing adverse effects to human health and the environment".

Following this, the Intergovernmental Forum on Chemical Safety (IFCS) and the International Programme on Chemical Safety (IPCS) prepared an assessment of the 12 worst offenders, known as the dirty dozen.

The INC met five times between June 1998 and December 2000 to elaborate the convention, and delegates adopted the Stockholm Convention on POPs at the Conference of the Plenipotentiaries convened from 22 to 23 May 2001 in Stockholm, Sweden.
The negotiations for the convention were completed on 23 May 2001 in Stockholm. The convention entered into force on 17 May 2004 with ratification by an initial 128 parties and 151 signatories. Co-signatories agree to outlaw nine of the dirty dozen chemicals, limit the use of DDT to malaria control, and curtail inadvertent production of dioxins and furans.

Parties to the convention have agreed to a process by which persistent toxic compounds can be reviewed and added to the convention, if they meet certain criteria for persistence and transboundary threat. The first set of new chemicals to be added to the convention were agreed at a conference in Geneva on 8 May 2009.

As of September 2022, there are 186 parties to the convention (185 states and the European Union). Notable non-ratifying states include the United States, Israel, and Malaysia.

The Stockholm Convention was adopted to EU legislation in Regulation (EC) No 850/2004. In 2019, the latter was replaced by Regulation (EU) 2019/1021.

Summary of provisions
Key elements of the Convention include the requirement that developed countries provide new and additional financial resources and measures to eliminate production and use of intentionally produced POPs, eliminate unintentionally produced POPs where feasible, and manage and dispose of POPs wastes in an environmentally sound manner. Precaution is exercised throughout the Stockholm Convention, with specific references in the preamble, the objective, and the provision on identifying new POPs.

Persistent Organic Pollutants Review Committee
When adopting the convention, provision was made for a procedure to identify additional POPs and the criteria to be considered in doing so. At the first meeting of the Conference of the Parties (COP1), held in Punta del Este, Uruguay, from 2–6 May 2005, the POPRC was established to consider additional candidates nominated for listing under the convention.

The committee is composed of 31 experts nominated by parties from the five United Nations regional groups and reviews nominated chemicals in three stages. The Committee first determines whether the substance fulfills POP screening criteria detailed in Annex D of the convention, relating to its persistence, bioaccumulation, potential for long-range environmental transport (LRET), and toxicity. If a substance is deemed to fulfill these requirements, the Committee then drafts a risk profile according to Annex E to evaluate whether the substance is likely, as a result of its LRET, to lead to significant adverse human health and/or environmental effects and therefore warrants global action. Finally, if the POPRC finds that global action is warranted, it develops a risk management evaluation, according to Annex F, reflecting socioeconomic considerations associated with possible control measures. Based on this, the POPRC decides to recommend that the COP list the substance under one or more of the annexes to the convention. The POPRC has met annually in Geneva, Switzerland, since its establishment. 
	
The seventh meeting of the Persistent Organic Pollutants Review Committee (POPRC-7) of the Stockholm Convention on Persistent Organic Pollutants (POPs) took place from 10 to 14 October 2011 in Geneva. POPRC-8 was held from 15 to 19 October 2012 in Geneva, POPRC-9 to POPRC-15 were held in Rome, while POPRC-16 needed to be held online.

Listed substances 
There were initially twelve distinct chemicals ("dirty dozen") listed in three categories. Two chemicals, hexachlorobenzene and polychlorinated biphenyls, were listed in both categories A and C. Currently, five chemicals are listed in both categories.

Chemicals newly proposed for inclusion in Annexes A, B, C 
POPRC-7 considered three proposals for listing in Annexes A, B and/or C of the convention: chlorinated naphthalenes (CNs), hexachlorobutadiene (HCBD) and pentachlorophenol (PCP), its salts and esters. The proposal is the first stage of the POPRC's work in assessing a substance, and requires the POPRC to assess whether the proposed chemical satisfies the criteria in Annex D of the convention. The criteria for forwarding a proposed chemical to the risk profile preparation stage are persistence, bioaccumulation, potential for long-range environmental transport (LRET), and adverse effects.

POPRC-8 proposed hexabromocyclododecane for listing in Annex A, with specific exemptions for production and use in expanded polystyrene and extruded polystyrene in buildings. This proposal was agreed at the sixth Conference of Parties on 28 April-10 May 2013.

POPRC-9 proposed di-, tri-, tetra-, penta-, hexa-, hepta- and octa-chlorinated napthalenes, and hexachlorobutadiene for listing in Annexes A and C. It also set up further work on pentachlorophenol, its salts and esters, and decabromodiphenyl ether, perfluorooctanesulfonic acid, its salts and perfluorooctane sulfonyl chloride.

POPRC-15 proposed PFHxS for listing in Annex A without specific exemptions.

Currently, methoxychlor, dechlorane plus, UV-328, chlorpyrifos, long-chain perfluorocarboxylic acids and medium-chain chlorinated paraffins are under review.

Controversies 
Although some critics have alleged that the treaty is responsible for the continuing death toll from malaria, in reality the treaty specifically permits the public health use of DDT for the control of mosquitoes (the malaria vector). There are also ways to prevent high amounts of DDT consumed by using other malaria controls such as window screens. As long as there are specific measures taken, such as use of DDT indoors, then the limited amount of DDT can be used in a regulated fashion. From a developing country perspective, a lack of data and information about the sources, releases, and environmental levels of POPs hampers negotiations on specific compounds, and indicates a strong need for research.

Another controversy would be certain POPs (which are continually active, specifically in the Arctic Biota) that were mentioned in the Stockholm Convention, but were not part of the Dirty Dozen such as perfluorooctane sulfonate (PFOS). PFOS have many general uses such as stain repellents but have many properties which can make it a dangerous due to the fact that PFOS can be highly resistant to environmental breakdown. PFOS can be toxic in terms of increased offspring death, decrease in body weight, and the disruption of neurological systems. What makes this compound controversial is the economic and political impact it can have among various countries and businesses.

Related conventions and other ongoing negotiations regarding pollution 
 Rotterdam Convention on the Prior Informed Consent Procedure for Certain Hazardous Chemicals and Pesticides in International Trade 
 Convention on Long-Range Transboundary Air Pollution (CLRTAP)
 Basel Convention on the Control of Transboundary Movements of Hazardous Wastes and their Disposal
 Minamata Convention on Mercury

Ongoing negotiations 
 Intergovernmental Forum on Chemical Safety (IFCS)
 Strategic Approach to International Chemicals Management (SAICM)

References

Further reading 
 Chasek, Pam, David L. Downie, and J.W. Brown (2013). Global Environmental Politics, 6th Edition, Boulder: Westview Press.
 Downie, D., Krueger, J. and Selin, H. (2005). "Global Policy for Toxic Chemicals", in R. Axelrod, D. Downie and N. Vig (eds.) The Global Environment: Institutions, Law & Policy, 2nd Edition, Washington: CQ Press.
 Downie, David and Jessica Templeton (2013). "Persistent Organic Pollutants." The Routledge Handbook of Global Environmental Politics. New York: Routledge.
 
 
 
 Porta, M., Gasull, M., López, T., Pumarega, J. Distribution of blood concentrations of persistent organic pollutants in representative samples of the general population. United Nations Environment Programme – Regional Activity Centre for Cleaner Production (CP/RAC) Annual Technical Publication 2010, vol. 9, pp. 24–31 (PDF).
 Selin, H. (2010). Global Governance of Hazardous Chemicals: Challenges of Multilevel Management, Cambridge: The MIT Press.

External links 
 Stockholm Convention Secretariat
 Text of the Convention
 Ratifications
 Earth Negotiation Bulletin coverage of Stockholm Convention Meetings
 Introduction to the POPs Convention 

Environmental treaties
Biodegradable waste management
Chemical safety
Obsolete pesticides
Treaties concluded in 2001
Treaties entered into force in 2004
History of Stockholm
Waste treaties
Regulation of chemicals
2004 in the environment
Treaties of Afghanistan
Treaties of Albania
Treaties of Algeria
Treaties of Angola
Treaties of Antigua and Barbuda
Treaties of Argentina
Treaties of Armenia
Treaties of Australia
Treaties of Austria
Treaties of Azerbaijan
Treaties of the Bahamas
Treaties of Bahrain
Treaties of Bangladesh
Treaties of Barbados
Treaties of Belarus
Treaties of Belgium
Treaties of Belize
Treaties of Benin
Treaties of Bolivia
Treaties of Bosnia and Herzegovina
Treaties of Botswana
Treaties of Brazil
Treaties of Bulgaria
Treaties of Burkina Faso
Treaties of Burundi
Treaties of Cambodia
Treaties of Cameroon
Treaties of Canada
Treaties of Cape Verde
Treaties of the Central African Republic
Treaties of Chad
Treaties of Chile
Treaties of the People's Republic of China
Treaties of Colombia
Treaties of the Comoros
Treaties of the Republic of the Congo
Treaties of the Cook Islands
Treaties of Costa Rica
Treaties of Ivory Coast
Treaties of Croatia
Treaties of Cuba
Treaties of Cyprus
Treaties of the Czech Republic
Treaties of North Korea
Treaties of the Democratic Republic of the Congo
Treaties of Denmark
Treaties of Djibouti
Treaties of Dominica
Treaties of the Dominican Republic
Treaties of Ecuador
Treaties of Egypt
Treaties of El Salvador
Treaties of Eritrea
Treaties of Estonia
Treaties of Ethiopia
Treaties of Fiji
Treaties of Finland
Treaties of France
Treaties of Gabon
Treaties of the Gambia
Treaties of Georgia (country)
Treaties of Germany
Treaties of Ghana
Treaties of Greece
Treaties of Guatemala
Treaties of Guinea
Treaties of Guinea-Bissau
Treaties of Guyana
Treaties of Honduras
Treaties of Hungary
Treaties of Iceland
Treaties of India
Treaties of Indonesia
Treaties of Iran
Treaties of Iraq
Treaties of Ireland
Treaties of Italy
Treaties of Jamaica
Treaties of Japan
Treaties of Jordan
Treaties of Kazakhstan
Treaties of Kenya
Treaties of Kiribati
Treaties of Kuwait
Treaties of Kyrgyzstan
Treaties of Laos
Treaties of Latvia
Treaties of Lebanon
Treaties of Lesotho
Treaties of Liberia
Treaties of the Libyan Arab Jamahiriya
Treaties of Liechtenstein
Treaties of Lithuania
Treaties of Luxembourg
Treaties of Madagascar
Treaties of Malawi
Treaties of the Maldives
Treaties of Mali
Treaties of Malta
Treaties of the Marshall Islands
Treaties of Mauritania
Treaties of Mauritius
Treaties of Mexico
Treaties of the Federated States of Micronesia
Treaties of Monaco
Treaties of Mongolia
Treaties of Montenegro
Treaties of Morocco
Treaties of Mozambique
Treaties of Myanmar
Treaties of Namibia
Treaties of Nauru
Treaties of Nepal
Treaties of the Netherlands
Treaties of New Zealand
Treaties of Nicaragua
Treaties of Niger
Treaties of Nigeria
Treaties of Niue
Treaties of Norway
Treaties of Oman
Treaties of Pakistan
Treaties of Palau
Treaties of the State of Palestine
Treaties of Panama
Treaties of Papua New Guinea
Treaties of Paraguay
Treaties of Peru
Treaties of the Philippines
Treaties of Poland
Treaties of Portugal
Treaties of Qatar
Treaties of South Korea
Treaties of Moldova
Treaties of Romania
Treaties of Russia
Treaties of Rwanda
Treaties of Samoa
Treaties of São Tomé and Príncipe
Treaties of Senegal
Treaties of Serbia
Treaties of Seychelles
Treaties of Sierra Leone
Treaties of Singapore
Treaties of Slovakia
Treaties of Slovenia
Treaties of the Solomon Islands
Treaties of the Transitional Federal Government of Somalia
Treaties of South Africa
Treaties of Spain
Treaties of Sri Lanka
Treaties of Saint Kitts and Nevis
Treaties of Saint Lucia
Treaties of Saint Vincent and the Grenadines
Treaties of the Republic of the Sudan (1985–2011)
Treaties of Suriname
Treaties of Eswatini
Treaties of Sweden
Treaties of Switzerland
Treaties of Syria
Treaties of Tajikistan
Treaties of Thailand
Treaties of North Macedonia
Treaties of East Timor
Treaties of Togo
Treaties of Tonga
Treaties of Trinidad and Tobago
Treaties of Tunisia
Treaties of Turkey
Treaties of Tuvalu
Treaties of Uganda
Treaties of Ukraine
Treaties of the United Arab Emirates
Treaties of the United Kingdom
Treaties of Tanzania
Treaties of Uruguay
Treaties of Vanuatu
Treaties of Venezuela
Treaties of Vietnam
Treaties of Yemen
Treaties of Zambia
Treaties of Zimbabwe
Treaties entered into by the European Union
United Nations treaties
2001 in Sweden
Treaties extended to the Faroe Islands
Treaties extended to Hong Kong
Treaties extended to Macau